Johann Sebastian Bach composed the church cantata  (The miserable shall eat), 75, in Leipzig for the first Sunday after Trinity and first performed it on 30 May 1723. The complex work in two parts of seven movements each marks the beginning of his first annual cycle of cantatas.

Bach composed the cantata at a decisive turning point in his career. After various positions in churches and courts, he assumed his post of Thomaskantor in Leipzig on the first Sunday after Trinity, performing this cantata. He began the ambitious project of composing a new cantata for every occasion of the liturgical year.

The work is structured in an unusual layout of 14 movements in two symmetrical parts, to be performed before and after the sermon. The unknown poet begins his text with a quotation from Psalm 22 and departs from its ideas on wealth and poverty, rich and poor, and illustrates the contrasts. The focus of the second part is on being poor or rich in spirit. Both parts are concluded by a stanza of Samuel Rodigast's hymn "".

Background 
He was 38 years old and had a reputation as an organist and organ expert. He had composed church cantatas, notably the funeral cantata  around 1708.

History and words 
He started a project of composing one cantata for each Sunday and holiday of the liturgical year, termed by Christoph Wolff "an artistic undertaking on the largest scale".

The prescribed readings for the Sunday were from the First Epistle of John, "God is Love"
(), and from the Gospel of Luke, the parable of the Rich man and Lazarus. An unknown poet begins the cantata with a verse from a psalm,  (verse 27 in the Luther Bible), "The meek shall eat and be satisfied: they shall praise the Lord that seek him: your heart shall live for ever", connecting the gospel to the Old Testament as a starting point. The later cantata for the same occasion,  (Break your bread for the hungry), begins similarly with a quotation from the Old Testament. The poet expands on the contrast of "" (wealth and poverty, rich and poor) in fourteen elaborate movements, arranged in two parts to be performed before and after the sermon. The poet expands the contrast of "" (wealth and poverty, rich and poor)  Both parts are concluded by a stanza of Samuel Rodigast's hymn "", stanza 2 in movement 7, stanza 6 in movement 14.

The autograph score is written neatly on non-Leipzig paper, probably while Bach still lived in Köthen. A Leipzig chronicle, "", reported the social event: "" (... performed ... with good applause his first music). "Good applause" means "great approval" rather than clapping of hands. A different translation renders the note as "... the new Cantor and Director of the Collegium Musicum, Herr Johann Sebastian Bach, who has come hither from the Prince's court of Cöthen, produced his first music here with great success."

Music

Structure and scoring 
The cantata is structured in two parts of seven movements each, to be performed before and after the sermon. It is scored for four vocal soloists (soprano (S), alto (A), tenor (T) and bass (B)), a four-part choir SATB, trumpet (Tr), two oboes (Ob), oboe d'amore (Oa), two violins (Vl), viola (Va), and basso continuo (Bc) including bassoon. The two parts of seven movements each are composed as the same arrangement of alternating recitatives and arias with a concluding chorale, only Part II is opened by a sinfonia instead of a chorus. The duration is given as 35 minutes.

In the following table of the movements, the scoring follows the Neue Bach-Ausgabe. The keys and time signatures are taken from Alfred Dürr, using the symbol for common time (4/4). The instruments are shown separately for winds and strings, while the continuo, playing throughout, is not shown.

Movements 
Bach marked the occasion, creating the opening chorus reminiscent of a French overture, with a slow first section in dotted rhythm and a fast fugue. The composition can also be seen as a prelude and fugue on a large scale. The prelude is again in two sections separated by a short interlude, in the way of a motet according to the different ideas of the text. In the fugue on the words "Euer Herz soll ewiglich leben" (your heart shall live for ever), the subject is developed three times, again separated by interludes.

Four of the recitatives are "secco", accompanied only by the continuo, but the first one of each part is "accompagnato", brightened by the strings. In the arias, the voice and the instruments mostly share the themes. The arias can be considered as a suite of French dance movements, the tenor a Polonaise, the soprano aria a Minuet, the alto aria a Passepied and the bass aria a Gigue. In the last aria, the trumpet opens the setting and then accompanies the bass in virtuoso figuration, adding splendour to the words "" (My heart believes and loves).

The music of the two stanzas of the chorale is identical. The tune is not a simple four-part setting as in most of Bach's later cantatas, but the voices are embedded in a concerto of the orchestra, led by violin I and oboe I. The instrumental theme is derived from the first line of the chorale tune.

The sinfonia beginning Part II, rare in Bach's cantatas, is especially remarkable because it is a chorale fantasia on the same chorale melody. The tune is played by the trumpet which was silent throughout Part I, as the cantus firmus against a polyphonic string setting, emphasizing once more "Was Gott tut, das ist wohlgetan" (What God does is well done).

Recordings 
The entries of the following table are taken from the list of recordings is provided by Bach Cantatas Website. Ensembles playing on period instruments in historically informed performance are marked by green background.

References

Sources 
 
 Die Elenden sollen essen, BWV 75; BC A 94 / Sacred cantata (1st Sunday after Trinity) Bach Digital
 BWV 75 Die Elenden sollen essen English translation, University of Vermont
 BWV 75 Die Elenden sollen essen text, scoring, University of Alberta
 Brian Robins: Cantata No. 75, "Die Elenden sollen essen," BWV 75 Allmusic
 Luke Dahn: BWV 75.7=75.14 bach-chorales.com

External links 
 Die Elenden sollen essen, BWV 75: performance by the Netherlands Bach Society (video and background information)

Church cantatas by Johann Sebastian Bach
Psalm-related compositions by Johann Sebastian Bach
1723 compositions